The Association for Relations Across the Taiwan Straits (ARATS; ; often abbreviated as 海协会 / 海協會) is an organization set up by the People's Republic of China for handling technical and business matters with the Republic of China (Taiwan).

The ROC counterpart to ARATS is the Straits Exchange Foundation (SEF).

The foundation's founding chairman was former Shanghai mayor Wang Daohan, honorary chairman Rong Yiren. Negotiations with SEF stopped in 1999, and after Wang's death in 2005, no new chair was appointed until 2008. Following the election of Ma Ying-jeou to the presidency of the Republic of China on Taiwan, talks between ARATS and SEF have restarted and progress was made in the areas of transport and economy such as the Three links in 2008 and Economic Cooperation Framework Agreement in 2010. Chen Yunlin, who was formerly head of the State Council Taiwan Affairs Office, was the head of ARATS from 2008 to 2013. He has met his counterpart Chiang Pin-kung in 2008.

List of presidents

See also
 Economic Cooperation Framework Agreement
 Straits Exchange Foundation (SEF), Taiwan
 Taiwan Affairs Office

References

External links 
 海峡两岸关系协会 

1991 establishments in China
Cross-Strait relations
Organizations based in Beijing
Organizations established in 1991